Michael Hamish Budd (born 2 July 1974) is an Australian film actor, director and producer. Budd is best known for playing Esmael, alongside Henry Cavill (Man of Steel) and Sigourney Weaver in The Cold Light of Day. The film also starred Bruce Willis.

Budd is the first Australian of African American descent to direct and produce a feature film in Australia.

In 2012/13 he directed and produced Love of My Life a horror thriller which he also stars in alongside Peter O'Brien and Diarmid Heidenreich. On 9 November it premiered in America at the 2013 second annual Mt. Hood Independent Film Festival in the state of Oregon U.S.A. The film went on to win Best Horror/Thriller at the festival. On the 29 April 2014 it was released on Video on Demand release with Gravitas Ventures.

His second feature, Life of the Party, starring Christopher Kirby  completed filming December 2016. It premiered on the 14th of September 2018 at the Arena Cinelounge Sunset Los Angeles in the U.S. state of California. The screenplay that was co-written by Budd was picked up by the Oscars Foundation to display in the Library of the Academy of Motion Picture Arts & Sciences for the permanent Core Collection.

Budd's third feature film, a science fiction thriller titled Enter Sanctum starring ACCTA award-winner Lara Robinson is in post Production.

In 2020 Michael began shooting his 4th feature film Ruby's Choice, an Australian drama touching on the important subject matter of dementia for the Glenn Family Foundation and the Sir Owen Glenn legacy. The film stars Jane Seymour OBE and Jacqueline McKenzie, with 50% of all the profits going back to dementia research. The production was halted due to COVID-19 and then moved from Queensland to Windsor to complete filming under strict COVID guidelines in August 2020. Budd described shooting a feature film in the middle of a pandemic the most challenging of any of his past feature films. Ruby's Choice premiered at Margaret River HEART for CinefestOZ on the Sunday 29 August 2021

Personal
Budd was born in Paddington, Sydney, New South Wales. His mother is an Australian of French descent, his father is African-American, and he has a sister. Michael's cousin is Shawn Budd, Australian professional Snooker player and 4 times Australian Open Snooker Champion. On 30 January 2014, Michael had his first child, a son named Harris Alister Budd, with longtime partner and fashion designer, Allison Berger.

Career
In 1995, Michael Budd was a resident supporting artist in Australian TV program Heartbreak High. Budd's initial break in Hollywood came in 2001 when the Wachowskis selected him as a body double and stand in for Laurence Fishburne in The Matrix Reloaded and The Matrix Revolutions. After 200 shoot days the directors cast him in his own role as Zion Controller. In 2008 Budd starred a in a music video for roll deep called Moving in Circles which featured Goldie. Budd studied Acting and Staging in London where he was mentored under a second generation Meisner tutor (Scott Williams) and the teachings of William Ball. After nearly three years with the conservatory, he graduated from the Meisner technique with the Impulse Company in 2010 he  then went on to play on stage in works of Chekhov and Shakespeare and Mamet plays, in particular playing Othello in a shortened version of Othello in the Tristan Bate Theatre in London's West End.

In 2011 Mabrouk El Mechri cast Budd as Esmael in The Cold Light of Day, set and shot completely in Spain. He played a Mossad agent, with dialogue in both Hebrew and English.

On the 7th March 2022, Rubys Choice premiered in the  Santa Barbara, California at the 37th Santa Barbara International Film Festival where it was Nominee Best International Feature Film.

References

External links 

 

1974 births
Living people
Australian male film actors
Australian film directors
Australian film producers
Australian screenwriters
People from New South Wales